Bangladesh Nationalist Front is  a political party in Bangladesh. Former member of parliament for Dhaka-17 Abul Kalam Azad is the chairman of the party.

History
Nazmul Huda founded Bangladesh Nationalist Front in August 2012 after resigning from Bangladesh Nationalist Party on 6 June 2012. Abul Kamal Azad, member-secretary, expelled Huda from Bangladesh Nationalist Front. The Front was registered with the Bangladesh Election Commission in 2015. In 2015 during talks with President Abdul Hamid over the next election Bangladesh Nationalist Front proposed that the Election Commission Secretariat be scrapped.

References

 
Nationalist parties in Asia
Political parties in Bangladesh
Political parties established in 2012
2012 establishments in Bangladesh
Organisations based in Dhaka